Rafael Escalante Guerrero (born 25 February 1995) is a former Mexican professional footballer who played as a defender. He made his professional debut with Tampico Madero during an Ascenso MX draw against Lobos BUAP on 23 July 2016.

References

External links
 

1995 births
Living people
People from Gómez Palacio, Durango
Mexican footballers
Footballers from Durango
Association football defenders
Ascenso MX players
Liga Premier de México players
Tampico Madero F.C. footballers